The Debar dialect (Debarski dijalekt) is a member of the subgroup of the western and north-western dialects of the western group of dialects of Macedonian. The dialect is mainly spoken in the city of Debar and the surrounding areas in North Macedonia. The Debar dialect is closed with the Reka dialect and the dialect of Galicnik. In the dialect are used a lot of archaic words.

Phonological characteristics

fixed accent 
/d͡ʒ/ deaffricated and merged with /ʒ/
the Proto-Slavic *ǫ has denazalized to [o] (*rǫka → рока)
use of o instead of the soft form (крв > корв)
absence of the intervocalic  in the plural forms of monosyllabic nouns (e.g. лебо(в)и, дождо(в)и, etc.)

Morphological characteristics

use of ќа instead of ќе
three definite articles pertaining to the position of the object (see Macedonian grammar)
use of the suffix -т for third person singular

Notes

Dialects of the Macedonian language
Debar Municipality